Zoomin is a media and entertainment company located in Schiphol-Rijk, the Netherlands. Zoomin's video production is availavle in 7 languages and is active with online advertising sales.

History 

Founded in 2000, the company has grown as an independent producer of video content. In July 2015 MTG acquired 51% of Zoomin making the company part of the group that included ESL (the world’s largest eSports company) and Splay (Scandinavia’s number one MCN and digital content creator). In May 2018 MTG took full ownership of Zoomin. In October 2019, Zoomin was acquired by Azerion (100%) from Modern Times Group MTG AB, broadening Azerion’s content with premium videos for consumers, advertisers and publishers.

The Zoomin Multiple Platform Network now generates more than 5 billion monthly video views and has a combined subscriber count of over 150 million across its various channels.

MPN 

In addition to its original content creation, Zoomin also provides end-to-end channel management and optimization services for brands and media companies to grow their presence on YouTube. The premium service, which includes a full suite of software tools and consultation on programming strategy, is designed to build an audience and engagement around clients’ video content. With experience in both content creation and channel management, Zoomin is able to offer and provide the opportunity for collaboration and cross promotion between different online content creators and between creators and brands across multiple platforms.

Original content 

Zoomin produces short-form video content from its worldwide network of video journalists. It produces ten unique new videos a day in English, which are localized in nine additional languages through its in-house production facilities. The stories are about entertainment, life-style, sports, fashion, and character-driven stories. Zoomin content has been used by over 2,000 publishing sites, and it has relationships with online news sites such as The Huffington Post, AOL, Yahoo, Daily Motion, and more.

See also 
 Multi Channel Network
 Cost Per Mille
 Cost Per Impression
 YouTube
 List of YouTube personalities

References 

Mass media companies established in 2000
Mass media companies of the Netherlands
Entertainment companies of the Netherlands
2000 establishments in the Netherlands
Companies based in Amsterdam
Mass media companies